IBM introduced Server-Free backup with IBM Tivoli Storage Manager 5.1 in 2002 for Windows 2000 servers only.
Server-Free backup functionality (with DATAMOVER TYPE=SCSI) were included in IBM Tivoli Storage Manager version 5.1, 5.2, and 5.3, but not in 5.4 or later, but (DATAMOVER TYPE=NAS) are supported in 5.4 and later.

SCSI-3 Extended Copy
Server-Free data movement uses the SCSI-3 EXTENDED COPY command and are carried out by a data mover device that must exists on the SAN, and it is the data mover device that is responsible for copying the data, either from a SAN-attached (client-owned) disk to a SAN-attached tape drive (server-owned), or vice versa.

From the T10 working group, "The EXTENDED COPY command provides a means to copy data from one set of logical units to another set of logical units or to the same set of logical units. The entity within a SCSI device that receives and performs the EXTENDED COPY command is called the copy manager. The copy manager is responsible for copying data from the source devices to the destination devices. The copy source and destination devices are logical units that may reside in different SCSI devices or the same SCSI device."

Notes

External links
IBM Almaden Research Center
IBM - Server-Free Data Movement Information
IBM Tivoli Storage Manager Administrator's Guide, Chapter 7. Setting Up Server-Free Data Movement
IBM Tivoli Storage Manager for Windows, Version 5.3, SAN-based server-free data movement
IBM - Tivoli Storage Manager Administration Center: support for new and existing function
Introduction to T10
T10/1731-D Information technology ISO/IEC 14776-314 SCSI Primary Commands - 4 (SPC-4)
Tivoli Storage Manager Version 5.1 Technical Guide

Storage software
Tivoli Server-free backup